Ibateguara is a genus of moths belonging to the subfamily Tortricinae of the family Tortricidae. It consists of only one species, Ibateguara spinosissima, which is found in Brazil (Alagoas).

The wingspan is about 11 mm. The ground colour of the forewings is silver white, with a strigulation of black on both the ground colour and the markings. The hindwings are grey.

Etymology
The generic name is based on the name of the type locality of the type-species. The specific name refers to the spinulation of the socii and is derived from Latin spinosissima (meaning the most spined).

See also
List of Tortricidae genera

References

Euliini